The 1992 Patriot League men's basketball tournament was played at Stabler Arena in Bethlehem, Pennsylvania after the conclusion of the 1991–92 regular season. Top seed Fordham defeated #3 seed , 70–65 in the championship game, to win its second Patriot League Tournament title. The Rams earned an automatic bid to the 1992 NCAA tournament as #14 seed in the East region.

Format
All eight league members participated in the tournament, with teams seeded according to regular season conference record. Play began with the quarterfinal round.

Bracket

References

Tournament
Patriot League men's basketball tournament
Patriot League men's basketball tournament
Patriot League men's basketball tournament